Alexander Ksaverievich Bulatovich (26 September 1870 – 5 December 1919) tonsured Father Antony (отец Антоний) was a Russian military officer, explorer of Africa, writer, hieromonk and the leader of the imiaslavie movement in Eastern Orthodox Christianity.

Biography

Early life
Alexander was born to a family of Oryol nobility and was of Russian/Belarusian, French, Georgian, and Tatar descent. He studied in Tsarskoye Selo Lyceum, then served in the Hussar Leib Guard regiment.

Accomplishments
In 1896 he was a member of the Russian mission of the Red Cross in Ethiopia, where he became a confidant of Negus Menelek II of Ethiopia. In 1896 - 1899 he became a military aide of Menelek II in his war with Italy and the southern tribes. Bulatovich joined the expedition of Ras Wolde Giyorgis and became the first European to provide a scientific description of the Kaffa province (conquered by Menelek II where Bulatovich was among the Army). He was the first European to reach the mouth of the Omo River. Among the places named by Bulatovich is the Nicholas II Mountain range. He had to ask permission from the Emperor himself to name the range in his honour.

After Bulatovich returned to Russia he received a Silver Medal from the Russian Geographical Society for his work in Ethiopia and the military rank of a poruchik (later rotmistr) of the Leib Guard Hussars. He served in Saint Petersburg. In 1903 after his talks with Saint John of Kronstadt he resigned from the Army and became a monk (later hiero-schema-monk) of the Russian Skete of Saint Andrew near the much larger St. Panteleimon Monastery on Mount Athos in Greece. He also visited Ethiopia again trying to establish a Russian Orthodox Monastery there. He was tonsured as Father Antony and became known as Hieromonk Antony Bulatovich.

In 1907 after reading the book On Caucasus Mountains by the schema-monk Ilarion, he became one of the leaders of the imiaslavie movement within the Russian Orthodox Church. When the movement was proclaimed a heresy and disbanded by a Russian military force in 1913, he was in St. Petersburg pleading the cause of monks.

He continued his fight for the recognition of imiaslavie, published many theological books proving its dogmas, obtained an audience with the Tsar and eventually managed to secure some sort of rehabilitation for himself and his imiaslavtsy comrades. They were allowed to return to their positions in the Church without repentance.

Military service
In 1896–1899 he became a military aide of Menelek II in his war with Italy and the southern tribes. Bulatovich joined the expedition of Ras Wolde Giyorgis and became the first European to provide a scientific description of the Kaffa province (conquered by Menelek II where Bulatovich's was with the army ). He was the first European to reach the mouth of the Omo River. Among the places named by Bulatovich is the Nicholas II Mountain range. He had to ask permission from the Emperor himself to name the range in his honour.

After Bulatovich returned to Russia he received a Silver Medal from the Russian Geographical Society for his work in Ethiopia and the military rank of a poruchik (later rotmistr) of the Leib Guard Hussars. He served in Saint Petersburg. In 1903 after his talks with Saint John of Kronstadt he resigned from the Army and became a monk (later hiero-schema-monk) of the Russian Skete of Saint Andrew near the much larger St. Panteleimon Monastery on Mount Athos in Greece.

On August 28, 1914, Antony Bulatovich received permission to join the Russian Army as an army priest. During World War I Father Antony not only served as a priest but on "many occasions led soldiers to attack" and was awarded the Cross of St. George

Later life
After returning from the war he took part in the discussion about the imiaslavie. In October 1918 the Holy Synod of the Russian Orthodox Church canceled the decision allowing imyaslavtsy to participate in church services provided they repent. The decision was signed by Patriarch Tikhon of Moscow. In January 1919, Anthony Bulatovich stopped any relations with the Holy Synod and Tikhon and returned to his family estate in Lebedinka, where he started a small skete and lived the life of a hermit. He was the spiritual opponent of any civil war.

Death
On the night of December 6, 1919 he was murdered. There are conflicting accounts if the killers were deserters of White Army or Red Army or some unaffiliated robbers.

Bulatovich in Russian literature
Antony Bulatovich was most probably the original for the grotesque Schema-Hussar Alexei Bulanovich from the novel The Twelve Chairs by Ilf and Petrov. He is also the hero of Valentin Pikul's story The Hussar on a Camel. In addition he is the hero of the novel The Name of Hero by Richard Seltzer  (published by Houghton Mifflin in 1981). The complete text of that novel is online for free at http://www.seltzerbooks.com/hero.html
"Mazepa! Layers of Legend," short story by Richard Seltzer inspired by Bulatovich's life. Online for free at https://medium.com/@seltzer_57387/mazepa-layers-of-legend-1d4173fea9dd

Writings 
 A. K. Bulatovich, Ethiopia Through Russian Eyes: Country in Transition, 1896-1898, translated by Richard Seltzer, 2000, . http://www.seltzerbooks.com/russianeyes.html
 A. K. Bulatovich, With the Armies of Menelik II translated by Richard Seltzer http://www.seltzerbooks.com/armies.html
 A. K. Bulatovich, From Entotto to the River Baro translated by Richard Seltzer http://www.seltzerbooks.com/entotto.html
 A. K. Bulatovich, My Third Journey to Ethiopia, 1899-1900 translated by Richard Seltzer http://www.seltzerbooks.com/thirdjourney.html

See also
Russian people in Ethiopia
 Leonid Artamonov
 Nikolay Leontiev
 Nikolay Gumilyov

References

 Article in the Bibliographical Dictionary of Victims of Political Repressions
 Article on the site of Russian orthodox Church
 Article on Krotov's library
 Article on site geographia.ru
 Tatiana Sénina (moniale Kassia), Un palamite russe du début du XXème siècle : le hiéromoine Antoine Boulatovitch et sa doctrine sur l’énergie divine, in Scrinium, t. 6: Patrologia Pacifica Secunda (2010) 392–409.
 Tatiana Senina (Nun Kassia), The status of divine revelation in the works of Hieromonk Anthony Bulatovich, in Scottish Journal of Theology 64:4 (2011) 377–389.
 Tatiana Sénina (moniale Kassia), La doctrine du hiéromoine Antoine Boulatovitch sur les idées et sa théorie de la connaissance, in Scrinium. Journal of Patrology, Critical Hagiography and Ecclesiastical History, vol. 7-8: Ars Christiana: In Memoriam Michail F. Murianov (21.XI.1928-6.VI.1995) (2011-2012) Pt. 2, p. 314-325.
 THE ORIGINS OF ‘HERESY’ ON MOUNT ATHOS: ILARION’S NA GORAKH KAVKAZA (1907)
 For numerous related documents, including his official military record, as well as interviews with and letters from his sister Princess Mary Orbeliani see http://seltzerbooks.com/sourcesandrelateddocuments.html

External links
 

1870 births
1919 deaths
People from Oryol
People from Orlovsky Uyezd (Oryol Governorate)
Nobility from the Russian Empire
Explorers of Africa
Theologians from the Russian Empire
Religious leaders from the Russian Empire
Imperial Russian Army officers
Explorers from the Russian Empire
Anthropologists from the Russian Empire
Geographers from the Russian Empire
20th-century Eastern Orthodox theologians
19th-century Eastern Orthodox theologians
Russian military personnel of World War I
Tsarskoye Selo Lyceum alumni
Male murder victims
Murder victims from the Russian Empire